Presumed Insolent is the sixth studio album by American hardcore punk band the Adolescents. The record was released on July 26, 2013 via Concrete Jungle label.

Track listing
All tracks written by Tony Reflex and Steve Soto, except where noted.

Personnel

Tony Cadena - vocals, lyrics
Steve Soto - bass, lyrics, production
Mike McKnight - guitar
Dan Root - guitar
Armando del Rio - drums
Jim Monroe - mixing, recording, production
Mia Brandenburg - lyrics
Mario Rivière - artwork
Josue Rivas - photographer

References

2013 albums
Adolescents (band) albums